Ateret (lit. Crown) is an Israeli settlement organized as a community settlement in the West Bank. Located in the municipal jurisdiction of the Mateh Binyamin Regional Council, it is located on a hilltop, at an elevation of 760 metres, occupying land confiscated by Israel from three nearby Palestinian villages: Ajjul, 'Atara, and Umm Safa.

The international community considers Israeli settlements in the West Bank illegal under international law, but the Israeli government disputes this.

Etymology 
Initially, the locality was called Neve Tzof B, due to its proximity to the existing Neve Tzuf locality . Later, the name "Ateret" was given, in connection with the name of the biblical city "Atarot" in the land of the Tribe of Ephraim. This is due to the proximity to the village of Atara , which preserves this name.

History
The village was founded in August 1981 by a group, led by Tzvi Halamish, of eight families and a few singles.

According to ARIJ, Israel confiscated land from three nearby Palestinian villages in order to construct Ateret:

363 dunams from Ajjul,
163 dunums from 'Atara, and
186 dunams from Umm Safa.

References

Religious Israeli settlements
Populated places established in 1981
Mateh Binyamin Regional Council
1981 establishments in the Israeli Military Governorate
Community settlements
Israeli settlements in the West Bank